Captain Gordon Fox Rule (or Fox-Rule)  (16 August 1898 – 10 June 1987) was an English Brazilian First World War flying ace credited with seven aerial victories.

Early life and background
Fox Rule was born in São Paulo, Brazil, but was educated at Eastbourne College, in England, between 1914 and 1916. His mother was English and his father Brazilian, but descended from an ancient Scottish family originating in the Valley of the Rule in Roxburghshire.

Military service
Fox Rule joined the Royal Flying Corps as a cadet in early 1917, was commissioned as temporary second lieutenant (on probation) on 5 July 1917. He was confirmed in his rank on 31 August, and joined No. 49 Squadron RFC on 26 November 1917. His squadron was initially equipped with the Airco DH.4 light bomber, in which he gained his first two victories, driving down German reconnaissance aircraft in early March 1918. On 1 April 1918, the Royal Flying Corps and the Royal Naval Air Service were merged to form the Royal Air Force, and later that month his squadron was re-equipped with the Airco DH.9. On 15 May 1918 Fox Rule was appointed a flight commander with the acting rank of captain. In June he gained three more aerial victories, driving down two Albatros D.Vs, and shooting another down in flames. In July he sent a Fokker D.VII down out of control, and another in early August, bringing his total to seven. Fox Rule left No. 49 Squadron on 14 August 1918, and returned to the Home Establishment in the UK to serve as an instructor.

On 20 September 1918 his award of the Distinguished Flying Cross was gazetted, his citation reading:
Lieutenant (Temporary Captain) Gordon Fox-Rule.
Seeing a body of the enemy on the bank of the river he attacked them, causing them to disperse in disorder. He was then attacked by five biplanes; these he drove off, though his observer had been hit twice, and he landed safely at a French aerodrome. In all, he has taken part in thirty bomb raids and ten photographic reconnaissances, invariably displaying a marked offensive spirit."

He also received the Croix de guerre with palm from France in 1918.

List of aerial victories

Post-war service
Fox Rule was transferred to the RAF's unemployed list on 13 March 1919, but on 24 October 1919 was granted a short service commission with the rank of flying officer, and served in the Irish Republic during the War of Independence, flying Bristol F.2 fighters with No. 100 and No. 141 Squadrons. On 29 June 1921 Fox Rule relinquished his commission "on account of ill-health contracted in the Service", and was granted the rank of captain.

Post-war life
Fox Rule returned to Brazil, where he became the head of the Central Office in São Paulo of the Companhia de Terras Norte Paraná ("The Northern Lands of Paraná Company"), founded in 1925 to open up the northern part of Paraná State in southern Brazil, though almost entirely funded by British shareholders. In 1944 the company changed its name to Companhia Melhoramentos Norte do Paraná ("Company for the Improvement of Northern Paraná").

Fox Rule was also a leading member of the São Paulo Athletic Club, helping introduce Rugby Union to Brazil, with the first recorded match taking place in 1926.

In 1984 Fox Rule donated his collection of mementos, photographs and documents covering his military career to the Imperial War Museum in London.

References

1898 births
1987 deaths
People from São Paulo
Brazilian people of English descent
Brazilian people of Scottish descent
Royal Flying Corps officers
Royal Air Force personnel of World War I
British World War I flying aces
Brazilian flying aces
Recipients of the Distinguished Flying Cross (United Kingdom)
Recipients of the Croix de Guerre 1914–1918 (France)
People educated at Eastbourne College